Clear for Action is a 1984 video game published by The Avalon Hill Game Company.

Gameplay
Clear for Action is a game in which up to eight players can fight battles between multiple ships, set in the era of sailing ships.

Reception
Floyd Mathews reviewed the game for Computer Gaming World, and stated that "CFA is an entertaining game, which I recommend for both experienced and novice wargamers. Good luck, and may your swash never buckle!"

Reviews
Computer Gaming World - Oct, 1990

References

External links
Review in Family Computing
Review in MicroTimes

1984 video games
Atari 8-bit family games
Avalon Hill video games
Computer wargames
Naval video games
TRS-80 games
Turn-based strategy video games
Video games developed in the United States